Stay Rad! is the eighth studio album by the punk band Teenage Bottlerocket. The album was released by Fat Wreck Chords on March 15, 2019 on CD and LP. Stay Rad! is the first album consisting of original material since the death of drummer Brandon Carlisle, who died in late 2015.

Background 
Stay Rad! is the first album by Teenage Bottlerocket consisting of original material since Tales from Wyoming (2015). In 2017 Stealing The Covers was released, an album exclusively consisting of cover songs. The title of the album, Stay Rad!, is inspired by a former roadie of the band, who would wear a hat saying "stay rad".

On January 18 it was announced by Fat Wreck Chords that Teenage Bottlerocket would put out a new studio album on March 15 that year called Stay Rad!. A new song, "I Wanna be a Dog", was made available for streaming.

On February 20 the song "Everything to Me" was made available for streaming. An accompanying music video was released as well.

On March 14, a day before the official release, the entire album was made available for streaming via Alternative Press.

A video for "I Wanna Be a Dog" was released on August 21, 2019.

Track listing

Personnel

Performers 
 Kody Templeman - guitar, vocals
 Ray Carlisle - guitar, vocals
 Miguel Chen - bass
 Darren Chewka - drums

Production 
 Andrew Berlin - mixing, engineering, producing
 Sergie Loobkoff - layout
 Jason Livermore - mastering
 Jamy Cabre - photography

Charts

References 

2019 albums
Fat Wreck Chords albums
Teenage Bottlerocket albums